Kiskőrösi Futball Club is a Hungarian football club from the town of Kiskőrös.

History
Kiskőrösi FC debuted in the 1994–95 season of the Hungarian League and finished ninth.

Name changes 
?-1930: Kiskőrösi Football Club
1930: merger with Kiskőrösi MOVE SE
1930–?: Kiskőrösi Petőfi Testedző Egyesület
?-?: Kiskőrösi Levente Egyesület
?-?: Kiskőrösi SC
1947–1955: Kiskőrösi Petőfi SE
1948: merger with Kiskőrösi Barátság
1955–1957: Kiskőrösi Bástya
1957–?: Kiskőrösi Petőfi
?-1968: Kiskőrösi MEDOSZ
1968–1971: Kiskőrösi Gépjavító
1971: merger with Kiskőrösi Spartacusszal
1971–?: Kiskőrösi Petőfi Spartacus
?-1993: Kiskőrösi Petőfi LC
1993–1994 Kiskőrös-Stadler FC
1994: moved to Akasztó as Stadler FC 
1994: Akasztó FC
1994–2003: Kiskőrösi FC
?-present: Kiskőrösi LC

References

External links
 Profile

Football clubs in Hungary
1910 establishments in Hungary
Megyei Bajnokság I
Association football clubs established in 1910